Henri Guérin may refer to:

 Henri Guérin (fencer) (1905–1967), French Olympic fencer
 Henri Guérin (footballer) (1921–1995), French footballer